Come Sail Away – The Styx Anthology is a musical album by Styx, released on May 4, 2004. It is a compilation consisting of two compact discs and contains a thorough history of the band. The album encompasses many of the band's most popular and significant songs, ranging from the band's first single from their self-titled album, "Best Thing", through the song "One with Everything", a track included on Styx's most recent album at the time of release, Cyclorama.

In 2006, the album was re-released and repackaged as part of the Gold series.

Track listing

Personnel
 Dennis DeYoung - keyboards, vocals (all except disc 2, track 18)
 Tommy Shaw - guitar, vocals (disc 1, tracks 10–17, disc 2 tracks 1–14 & 17–18)
 James Young - guitar, vocals
 Chuck Panozzo - bass, vocals (all except disc 2, track 18)
 John Panozzo - drums (all except disc 2, tracks 17–18)
 Lawrence Gowan - vocals, keyboards (disc 2, track 18)
 Glen Burtnik - guitar, vocals (tracks 15–18)
 Todd Sucherman - drums (disc 2, tracks 17–18)
 John Curulewski - guitar, vocals (disc 1, tracks 1–9)

2004 greatest hits albums
Styx (band) compilation albums